Your Girl and Mine is a 1914 film promoting woman's suffrage. It was sponsored by Ruth Hanna McCormick as well as the National American Woman Suffrage Association NAWSA. It was produced by William Selig and directed by Giles R. Warren. Gilson Willets wrote the script. Motography covered the film. The movie was shot in Chicago, Illinois.

On October 14, 1914 the film premiered at the Auditorium Theatre, Chicago. McCormick wrote about the film for the Richmond Times-Dispatch stating the "melodramatic photoplay will prove as effective in gaining Votes for Women as Uncle Tom's Cabin was in the abolition of slavery."

The film featured Katharine Kaelred, Olive Wyndham, and Grace Darmond. Also appearing was Anna Howard Shaw addressing a suffrage convention. The complete cast had more than 400 members.

It was shown at variety of theaters nationwide over a two year period. McCormick and the NAWSA organized to coordinate advertising and ticket sales.

Cast
Cast as listed in the AFI Catalog

Gallery

See also
Women's suffrage in film
Votes for Women (film)
80 Million Women Want–?

References

External links

Shall Not Be Denied, Library of Congress exhibit

Further reading 
How Women’s Suffrage Has Been Represented in American Film

Media about women's suffrage in the United States
1914 films
American black-and-white films
Silent American drama films
1914 drama films
American silent feature films
1910s American films